Saint Petersburg Television Tower is a  Russian steel lattice television tower in Saint Petersburg, Russia. Being the first dedicated television tower in the Soviet Union, the Saint Petersburg TV Tower is utilized for transmitting for FM-/TV-broadcasting throughout the federal city.

History 

The Saint Petersburg TV Tower's construction commenced in 1962. Upon its completion in the same year, the tower was, and is, considered the first dedicated television tower to have ever served the Soviet Union, transmitting FM-/TV-broadcasting ever since.

Geography 

The Saint Petersburg TV Tower is situated at 3 Ulitsa Akademika Pavlova, which lies in the federal city of Saint Petersburg which, in turn, is the administrative centre of the Northwestern Federal District of the Russian Federation. The television tower is located in Central Saint Petersburg, wherein, several famous landmarks, such as famous parks and several embankments, can be found alongside and/or near the tower. In addition, the nearest metro station to the tower is the Petrogradskaya.

Construction and structure 

The Saint Petersburg TV Tower is a truss tower made up of steel, making it one of the sturdiest as well.

In addition, the Saint Petersburg TV Tower ranks as the eleventh-tallest lattice tower in the world, the second-tallest television tower, and the tallest lattice television tower in the whole of the Russian Federation (see list of tallest towers in the world).

Gallery 
''Click on the thumbnail to enlarge.

See also 
Lattice tower
List of tallest towers in the world
List of tallest freestanding structures in the world
List of tallest freestanding steel structures
List of famous transmission sites
Ostankino Tower, the tallest tower in Europe and Russia

References

External links 

St. Petersburg TV Tower  Buildings | EMPORIS
Saint Petersburg TV Tower - Virtual GlobeTrotting

Towers in Saint Petersburg
Towers completed in 1962
Towers built in the Soviet Union
Tourist attractions in Saint Petersburg
Radio masts and towers in Europe
Observation towers